Dmytro Hunia was elected hetman of the Zaporozhian Host in 1638. He was one of the leaders of the Ostryanyn Uprising, a 1638 Cossack uprising against the Polish–Lithuanian Commonwealth. The rebellion was sparked by the Sejm act of the same year that declared that non-Registered Cossacks are equal to ordinary peasants in their rights (and should be subjected to serfdom). The uprising was quelled by the forces of Jeremi Wiśniowiecki and Mikołaj Potocki. After a series of skirmishes the Cossacks capitulated at the Starzec river. Hunia and some other cossacks managed to flee to Russia.

See also
 Yakiv Ostryanin

Year of birth missing
Year of death missing
Cossack rebels
Hetmans of the Zaporozhian Cossacks